Free for All is a 1949 American comedy film directed by Charles Barton and starring Robert Cummings, Ann Blyth and Percy Kilbride.

Cast
A young man invents a pill that can turn water into gasoline. While staying in Washington to register his patent, he falls in love with his host's daughter. However, she works for a major oil company and after she lets slip to her employers about the magical new formula, they desperately try to get their hands on it.

Main cast
 Robert Cummings as Christopher Parker 
 Ann Blyth as Alva Abbott  
 Percy Kilbride as Henry J. Abbott  
 Ray Collins as A.B. Blair  
 Donald Woods as Roger Abernathy  
 Mikhail Rasumny as Dr. Axel Torgelson  
 Percy Helton as Joe Hershey  
 Harry Antrim as Mr. Whiting  
 Wallis Clark as Mr. Van Alstyne  
 Frank Ferguson as Hap Ross  
 Dooley Wilson as Aristotle 
 Russell Simpson as Farmer  
 Lester Matthews as Mr. Aberson  
 Murray Alper as McGuinness  
 Bill Walker as Herbert  
 Kenneth Tobey as Pilot  
 Harris Brown as Colonel  
 Willard Waterman as Commander H.C. Christie

Production
The film was based on a story by Herbert Clyde Lewis called Patent Applied For. In August 1947 Universal announced they had purchased the story and it would be the first film made by producer-writer Robert Buckner under Buckner's new contract with the studio.

In May 1949 the studio announced the film would be called Hot Water and would star Ann Blyth, who had recently been put on suspension by the studio; her casting meant the suspension was lifted. The project meant Buckner's proposed film Paradise Lost, 1949 was pushed back on Universal's schedule.

In May 1949 Robert Cummings was cast in the male lead and Charles Barton was appointed director. In June the title was changed to Free for All.

Filming started in Washington in June 1949. The Daughters of the American Revolution opposed filming comedy scenes at Mount Vernon. A compromise was reached where the scenes were shot at the grounds but not inside the shrine. There were twenty days filming at the studio.

References

Bibliography
 Goble, Alan. The Complete Index to Literary Sources in Film. Walter de Gruyter, 1999.

External links
 
 Free for All at TCMDB

1949 films
1949 comedy films
1940s English-language films
American comedy films
Universal Pictures films
Films directed by Charles Barton
Films scored by Frank Skinner
American black-and-white films
1940s American films